Sherwood Charles Schwartz (November 14, 1916 – July 12, 2011) was an American television screenwriter and producer. He worked on radio shows in the 1940s, but he now is best known for creating the 1960s television series Gilligan's Island on CBS and  The Brady Bunch on ABC. On March 7, 2008, Schwartz, at the time still active in his 90s, was honored with a star on the Hollywood Walk of Fame. That same year, Schwartz was also inducted into the Television Hall of Fame.

Early life
Schwartz was born in Passaic, New Jersey, to a Jewish family. His parents were Herman and Rose Schwartz. He was a younger brother of writer Al Schwartz. His younger brother, Elroy Schwartz (1923-2013), a comedy writer, became a principal screenwriter for Gilligan's Island and other series. Sherwood Schwartz is the uncle of Douglas Schwartz (who created the Baywatch TV series), Bruce Schwartz and Judithe Randall.

Career
Schwartz's entertainment career came "by accident". He relocated from New York to Southern California to pursue a Master of Science degree in Biology. In need of employment, he began writing jokes for Bob Hope's radio program, for which Schwartz's brother, Al Schwartz, worked. Schwartz recalled that Hope "liked my jokes, used them on his show and got big laughs. Then he asked me to join his writing staff. Schwartz had hoped to become a doctor, but found that he was unable to be admitted to medical school at that time, due to a quota limiting the number of Jewish students.

He went on to write for Ozzie Nelson's The Adventures of Ozzie and Harriet and other radio shows. Schwartz served in the United States Army for over four years. While serving, he was a writer on the Armed Forces Radio Network before he got his break in television. From 1956 to 1962, Schwartz was head writer for The Red Skelton Show, for which he won an Emmy Award in 1961. He went on to create and produce Gilligan's Island and The Brady Bunch. He wrote the theme song for three of his shows: Gilligan's Island (co-wrote), It's About Time, and The Brady Bunch.

Syndication turned his two major successes into TV institutions with cultural relevance. He made them icons and as a result became a television icon himself.

TV appearances
During the late 1990s and the 2000s, he made many appearances on TV talking about his series, on shows such as the CBS Evening News, 20/20, TV Land's Top Ten and A&E's Biography. He also took part in a "Creators" marathon on Nick at Nite in the late 1990s. He was also a guest at the 2004 TV Land Awards.

In 1988, Schwartz appeared on The Late Show with Ross Shafer for a Gilligan's Island reunion, along with all seven castaways from Gilligan's Island. This was the last time they were all together on television.  He also appeared as himself in a 1995 episode of Roseanne titled "Sherwood Schwartz, A Loving Tribute", which also featured the four surviving "Gilligan's Island" cast members.

Personal life
On December 23, 1941, Sherwood Schwartz married Mildred Seidman, and together they had four children: Donald Schwartz, who became an ophthalmologist; Lloyd J. Schwartz, who worked with his father in a show business; Ross Schwartz, who became an attorney; and Hope Juber, a writer and producer. His granddaughter is singer-songwriter Ilsey Juber, the daughter of Hope and guitarist Laurence Juber, the former lead guitarist for the band Wings.

Sherwood Schwartz's play, Rockers, a comedy-drama, had a production at Theatre West in honor of his 90th birthday.

Death

On July 12, 2011, Sherwood Schwartz died of natural causes in his sleep.

Portrayals
Schwartz was portrayed by Aaron Lustig in the TV movie Surviving Gilligan's Island and by Michael Tucker in Growing Up Brady.

Filmography
Schwartz produced a number of radio and TV shows during his career.

Stage productions
In 1990, he wrote Gilligan's Island: The Musical, still in production as of 2011. His son Lloyd, daughter Hope, and son-in-law Laurence Juber worked on the play as well. 

On November 10, 2006, his play Rockers opened in Theatre West in California. The play concerns the lives of three women living in a retirement home. The cast included Pat Crawford Brown, Lee Meriwether, and Elsa Raven.

Unsold pilots
He wrote and executive produced two unsold television pilots:
Scamps (1982) — starring Bob Denver, Dreama Denver, and Joey Lawrence
The Invisible Woman (1983) — starring Alexa Hamilton, Bob Denver, and Harvey Korman

Awards
Won the 1961 Emmy Award for his writing on The Red Skelton Show.
Was nominated for a Daytime Emmy for his 2004 special Still Brady After All These Years
On March 7, 2008, he received a star on the Hollywood Walk of Fame. Actresses Dawn Wells and Florence Henderson, who appeared in Gilligan's Island and The Brady Bunch, respectively, accompanied Schwartz when he received his star. Also present was Patrick Denver, son of actor Bob Denver from Gilligan's Island, and Christopher Knight and Susan Olsen, the child stars of The Brady Bunch.
Was also inducted into the Television Hall of Fame in 2008.

References

External links

 Sherwood Schwartz in The Comedy Hall of Fame Archives
 An interview from 2011 with Sherwood Schwartz
 
 Signature of Sherwood Schwartz from Here on Gilligan's Isle
 
 

1916 births
2011 deaths
Jewish American television producers
Jewish American screenwriters
American television writers
American male television writers
American entertainment industry businesspeople
20th-century American Jews
People from Passaic, New Jersey
Burials at Hillside Memorial Park Cemetery
Screenwriters from New Jersey
United States Army soldiers
21st-century American Jews
Television producers from New Jersey